Haverstraw Heliport  is a privately owned, public use heliport located one nautical mile (2 km) east of Haverstraw, a village in the Town of Haverstraw, Rockland County, New York, United States.

Facilities and aircraft 
Haverstraw Heliport covers an area of 6 acres (2 ha) at an elevation of 12 feet (4 m) above mean sea level. It has one helipad designated H1 with an asphalt surface measuring 50 by 50 feet (15 x 15 m).

For the 12-month period ending September 14, 2010, the heliport had 2,200 aircraft operations, an average of 183 per month: 95.5% general aviation and 4.5% military.
At that time there were three helicopters based at this facility.

References

External links 
  at New York State DOT Airport Directory
 Air Metro Helicopters, based at Haverstraw
 Aerial image as of April 1994 from USGS The National Map
 

Heliports in New York (state)
Transportation buildings and structures in Rockland County, New York